Equity Group Holdings Limited (EGHL), formerly Equity Bank Group, is a financial services holding company based in the African Great Lakes region. EGHL's headquarters are in Nairobi, Kenya, with subsidiaries in Kenya, Uganda, Tanzania, South Sudan, Rwanda, Democratic Republic of the Congo and a representative office in Ethiopia.

Overview

EGHL is the largest financial services conglomerate in East and Central Africa. As of August 2021, it had assets exceeding KSh 1.119 Trillion (US$10.1 billion). The group also had over 14 million customers in six African Great Lakes countries, with KSh790.6 billion (US$7.61 billion) in deposits.

In June 2008, EGHL was voted by Euromoney Awards for Excellence as the best bank in Kenya. EGHL was named the overall best bank in Kenya at the Renaissance Capital Bank Awards in August 2008 and was cited locally as the only stock that returned positive shareholder value during 2008 at the Nairobi Stock Exchange. EGHL was named as the Best Performing Company in Africa during the annual African Investor Index Awards, held on 21 September 2009, in New York City. EGHL has exclusive rights to issue American Express credit cards across the African continent outside South Africa.
As of the financial year ending 2020, EGHL reported an asset base worth Ksh1.015 trillion ($9.244 billion). The total group of customers was 14.3 million, with Ksh740.8 billion ($6.74 billion) in deposits.

In 2019, over 97% of EGHL transactions were done outside branches; with 79% via money and 11% via agency. In July 2020, the Euromoney Awards for Excellence voted EGHL as the Best Bank in Africa and for the second time in a row, the Best Digital Bank in Africa.

In 2021, 98% of the Groups transactions by count were done via its digital platforms which represented 65% of total value of transactions conducted by the group's customers.
As of June 2021, EGHL total assets were valued at KSh1.12 trillion (US$10.12 billion), with shareholders' funds valued at 
US$1,096,000,000 (KSh121,279,000,000). At that time the bank group had over 15 million customers and was the largest financial institution in East and Central Africa, when measured by total assets and shareholders' equity.

History
EGHL was founded in Kenya, the largest economy in the East African Community, as the Equity Building Society (EBS) in October 1984. EBS was originally a provider of mortgage financing for customers in the low income population. Also, due to its rural banking orientation, promotion of agribusiness is a significant and strategic intervention by the bank. By September 2015, Equity Bank had more than 9.2 million customers. The Banker listed Equity Bank among the Top 1,000 Banks in the World with the highest return on assets in the African continent, generating a rate of 6.84 per cent on assets deployed.

Prior to November 2014, Equity Bank was both a licensed bank and a holding company for its subsidiaries. On 31 October 2014, Equity Bank Group announced its intention to incorporate a new wholly owned subsidiary, Equity Bank Kenya Limited, to which it would transfer its Kenyan banking business, assets and liabilities. The rationale for the re-organisation is that by converting Equity Bank into a non-trading holding company that owns both banking and non-banking subsidiary companies and provides strategic, brand, risk and talent management to its subsidiaries, the Group will be better placed to invest and to develop the existing and new businesses as part of its third phase of growth and transformation. These resolutions were all adopted during an extraordinary shareholders general meeting held on 24 November 2014 leading to the formation of Equity Bank Kenya Limited.

In September 2015, the group completed its acquisition of 79 percent of DR Congo based  ProCredit Bank Congo SARL from Procredit Group. This acquisition marked the group's entry into sub-Saharan Africa’s third most populous country.

In April 2019, The EastAfrican newspaper reported that Equity Group had signed binding memoranda with Atlas Mara Limited (ATMA), to acquire banking units belonging to ATMA, in Zambia, Mozambique, Tanzania and Rwanda, in a share swap valued at US$105.71 million (KSh10.7 billion). The acquisition includes 62 percent of Banque Populaire du Rwanda, 100 percent of African Banking Corporation of Zambia, African Banking Corporation of Mozambique and African Banking Corporation of Tanzania. The transaction requires approval from regulators and shareholders from the five countries involved. In exchange for that ownership, ATMA will receive 6.27 percent shareholding in Equity Group Holdings Limited.

In June 2020, the New Times (Rwanda) newspaper reported that the ...."binding term sheet that has been signed for the proposed acquisition of Atlas Mara Group’s assets in Rwanda, Tanzania, Mozambique and Zambia had expired with the parties not having signed detailed transaction agreements".... Those plans were called off at that time.

In September 2019, Equity Bank Group began talks to acquire a controlling stake in Banque Commerciale du Congo (BCDC), the second-largest commercial bank in the Democratic Republic of the Congo. If and when the transaction is concluded, the new acquisition is expected to be merged with the existing Equity Bank Congo. In August 2020, Equity Group Holdings paid US$95 million (approx. KES:10.2 billion), for a 66.5 percent ownership in BCDC. Once the regulatory approvals are obtained, BCDC will be integrated into Equity Bank Congo.

In October 2019, The Group rebranded to Equity thereby eliminating the entity names the various subsidiaries previously carried like Group, Bank, Insurance, or Investment Bank thereby unifying the various brands according to the group MD and CEO, James Mwangi.This happened as the Group commemorated its 35th anniversary.

On 30 December 2020, Equity Group Holdings received regulatory approval from the DRC government to merge Equity Bank Congo (EBC) and the Banque Commerciale du Congo (BCDC) into Equity BCDC. In August 2021, data from EGHL reported that in six months ending June, Equity BCDC made a Ksh700 million ($6.37 million) profit before taxation making it the most profitable subsidiary of the group. This successful acquisition made EGHL surpass the Kshs 1 Trillion balance sheet mark making it the first bank in East and Central Africa to achieve that.

In August 2021, EGHL became the second most capitalized corporate entity at the Nairobi stock Exchange after hitting Kshs 200 Billion market capitalization mark.

Ownership
The stock of Equity Group Holdings Limited is traded on the Nairobi Securities Exchange, under the symbol: EQTY. On Thursday 18 June 2009, the Group's stock cross listed on the Uganda Securities Exchange and started trading that day, under the symbol: EBL. , shareholding in the group's stock was as depicted in the table below: As of 31 December 2020, shareholding in the group's stock was as depicted in the table below;

Board of directors
The following are the board  members of Equity Group Holdings Limited, as of July 2021.
 Isaac Macharia, Chairman
 James Mwangi, CBS, Group Managing Director & CEO
 Mary Wamae - Executive Director
 Dr. Edward Odundo - Non-executive Director
 Evelyn Rutagwenda - Non-executive Director
 Vijay Gidoomal - Non-executive Director
 Dr. Helen Gichohi - Non-executive Director
 Jonas Mushosho - Non-executive Director
 Lydia Ndirangu - Group company Secretary

Member companies
The companies that compose the Equity Group Holdings Limited include but are not limited to the following:

 Equity Bank Kenya Limited – Nairobi, Kenya  – 100% Shareholding – A commercial bank in Kenya, serving individuals and businesses.
 Equity Bank Rwanda Limited – Kigali, Rwanda  – 100% Shareholding – A commercial bank in Rwanda, serving both individuals and businesses.
 Equity Bank South Sudan Limited – Juba, South Sudan  – 100% Shareholding – A commercial bank in South Sudan.
 Equity Bank Tanzania Limited – Dar es Salaam, Tanzania  – 100% Shareholding – A commercial bank in Tanzania.
 Equity Bank Uganda Limited – Kampala, Uganda  – 100% Shareholding – A commercial bank in Uganda. 
 Equity BCDC – Kinshasa, Democratic Republic of the Congo : 77.5 percent Shareholding – A commercial bank in DR Congo.
 Equity Consulting Group Limited – Nairobi, Kenya 
 Equity Insurance Agency Limited – Nairobi, Kenya  – 100% Shareholding – The insurance agency arm of the group. Offering bancassurance services to customers
 Equity Nominees Limited – Nairobi, Kenya  – 100% Shareholding – A Nominee company. Holding investments on behalf of customers.
 Equity Investment Bank Limited – Nairobi, Kenya  – 100% Shareholding – An investment bank in Kenya. A member of the Nairobi Securities Exchange and licensed by the Capital Markets Authority.
 Finserve Africa Limited – Nairobi, Kenya  – 100% Shareholding – A mobile virtual network operator (MVNO) in the Kenya.
 Equity Group Foundation – Nairobi, Kenya  – 100% Shareholding – The philanthropy and corporate social responsibility arm of the group.
 Azenia - Nairobi, Kenya—100% Shareholding – A technological affiliate for developing digital solutions to the group.

See also

 British-American Investments Company
 Nairobi Stock Exchange
 Uganda Securities Exchange

References

External links
    Equity Bank Homepage 
  Nairobi Securities Exchange Website
  Central Bank of Kenya
  Equity Bank Builds KSh20 Billion War Chest for Africa Buyouts

Banks of Kenya
Nairobi
Holding companies of Kenya
Companies listed on the Nairobi Securities Exchange
Companies listed on the Uganda Securities Exchange
Banks established in 1984
Holding companies established in 1984
Kenyan companies established in 1984